Thomas Luther "Luke" Bryan (born July 17, 1976) is an American country singer, songwriter, and television personality. He began his music career writing songs for Travis Tritt and Billy Currington before signing with Capitol Nashville in 2007. He is one of the most successful and awarded country artists of the 2010s.

Bryan's first ten albums – I'll Stay Me (2007), Doin' My Thing (2009), Tailgates & Tanlines (2011), Crash My Party (2013), Spring Break...Here to Party (2013), Spring Break...Checkin' Out (2015), Kill the Lights (2015), Farm Tour... Here's to the Farmer (2016), What Makes You Country (2017), and Born Here Live Here Die Here (2020) – have included 27 number-one hits. Bryan often co-writes with Jeff Stevens. Since 2018, Bryan has been a judge on American Idol.

Bryan is a five-time "Entertainer of the Year,” being awarded by both the Academy of Country Music Awards and the Country Music Association. In 2019, Bryan's 2013 album Crash My Party received the first Album of the Decade award from the Academy of Country Music. He is one of the world's best-selling music artists, with over 75 million records sold.

Early life
Luke Bryan was born in Leesburg, Georgia, to LeClaire and Tommy Bryan, who owned a peanut farm.
 Shortly before Luke was going to move to Nashville at age 19, his elder brother Chris "was unexpectedly killed in a car accident ... I'm kind of hyperventilating talking about it. ... You never truly ... move beyond it." His mother, LeClaire, had made a statement: "We knew Luke at some point would come to Nashville," his mother said. "But ... you can't leave your family, and ... I couldn't bear the thought of him being away."

Instead, Luke went to college at Georgia Southern University in Statesboro, Georgia, where he joined the Sigma Chi fraternity and graduated in 1999 with a bachelor's degree in business administration. Luke Bryan met his future wife Caroline singing in a bar in Georgia. They went on dating for a year and a half before she ended things with Luke. Luke and Caroline went their separate ways of Luke moving to Nashville to focus on music and Caroline went on to focus on herself. After a few years, Luke came back and was performing in a bar where they reconnected with each other.

Two years later, Bryan finally made it to Nashville, after his father told him to pack his truck to pursue a career in music. He initially gained success as a songwriter, but soon after signed as a performer; his first major success was "All My Friends Say".

Music career

2006–2009: I'll Stay Me

Soon after his arrival in Nashville, Bryan joined a publishing house in the city. Among his first cuts was the title track of Travis Tritt's 2004 album My Honky Tonk History.

He was later signed by Capitol Nashville to a recording contract. In the meantime, Bryan co-wrote Billy Currington's single "Good Directions", which went to number one on the Hot Country Songs chart in mid-2007. Bryan co-wrote his debut single, "All My Friends Say", with producer Jeff Stevens. This song reached a peak of number 5 on the Hot Country Songs chart. In August 2007, Capitol Nashville released Bryan's debut album, I'll Stay Me. Bryan wrote or co-wrote all but one of its 11 songs. The album's second single, "We Rode in Trucks", peaked at number 33 while "Country Man" reached number 10.

2009–2011: Doin' My Thing
On March 10, 2009, he released an EP titled Spring Break with All My Friends that featured two new songs, "Sorority Girls" and "Take My Drunk Ass Home," plus an acoustic version of "All My Friends Say". After this EP, he released his fourth single, "Do I" in May 2009. Bryan wrote the song with Charles Kelley and Dave Haywood of Lady A, whose lead singer Hillary Scott also sings backing vocals on it. The song reached number 2 on the Hot Country Songs chart.

"Do I" was included on Bryan's second album, Doin' My Thing, which was released in October 2009. Also included on the album was a cover of OneRepublic's "Apologize". Bryan wrote the album's next two singles, "Rain Is a Good Thing" and "Someone Else Calling You Baby", with Dallas Davidson and Jeff Stevens, respectively. Both of these songs went to number one on the country music charts. AllMusic gave this album a positive review as well, with Stephen Thomas Erlewine considering Bryan more "relaxed" in comparison to his debut. On February 26, 2010, Bryan released a second EP, titled Spring Break 2...Hangover Edition, which featured three new songs: "Wild Weekend", "Cold Beer Drinker", and "I'm Hungover". While Bryan is mainly known as a country music singer, he has explored other genres like alternative rock with his cover of "Apologize".

Bryan appeared on the April 18, 2010, episode of Celebrity Apprentice alongside fellow country star Emily West. The task for each team was to make over an up-and-coming country star, with Bryan being selected by Team Rocksolid, led by Bill Goldberg, and West being selected by team Tenacity, led by Cyndi Lauper. Bryan's makeover failed to impress the judges, leading to Rocksolid losing the task. Bryan's single "Rain Is a Good Thing" and West's single "Blue Sky" were both sold on iTunes, with a month's worth of sales being donated to Lauper's charity, the Stonewall Community Foundation, resulting in $25,000 being raised.

2011–2013: Tailgates & Tanlines
Bryan released his third EP, Spring Break 3...It's a Shore Thing, on February 25, 2011, featuring four new songs - "In Love With the Girl," "If You Ain't Here to Party," "Shore Thing," and "Love In a College Town". This release was followed by Bryan's seventh single, "Country Girl (Shake It for Me)", which was released on March 14, 2011. Also co-written by Bryan and Davidson, it served as the lead-off single to his third studio album, Tailgates & Tanlines, which was released August 9, 2011. The album peaked at number one on the Top Country Albums chart and number two on the Billboard 200 chart. "Country Girl" peaked at number 4 on the country music charts and number 22 on the Billboard Hot 100 chart. The album's next three singles - "I Don't Want This Night to End", "Drunk on You", and "Kiss Tomorrow Goodbye"  -  all reached number one on the country music charts. Bryan, along with Eric Church, sang guest vocals on Jason Aldean's "The Only Way I Know," the second single from his 2012 album, Night Train. 

On March 6, 2012, Bryan released his fourth Spring Break EP entitled Spring Break 4...Suntan City. Along with the title track, which Bryan co-wrote with Dallas Davidson, Rhett Akins and Ben Hayslip, the EP includes "Spring Break-Up," "Little Bit Later On," and "Shake the Sand". On January 30, 2013, Bryan announced his first compilation album, Spring Break...Here to Party, which includes fourteen songs - twelve from his previous Spring Break EPs and two new tracks. It was released on March 5. The album debuted at number one on both the Billboard Top Country Albums chart and the Billboard 200 chart, becoming the first album of his career to top the all-genre album chart. One of the new Spring Break songs, "Buzzkill", reached the top 20 on the Hot Country Songs chart.

2013–2015: Crash My Party

Luke Bryan's fourth studio album, Crash My Party, was released on August 12, 2013. The album's first single, "Crash My Party", was premiered in a performance at the 2013 ACM Awards and released on April 7, 2013. It reached number one on the Country Airplay chart in July 2013. The album's second single, "That's My Kind of Night", was released to country radio on August 5, 2013. It reached number one on the Hot Country Songs chart in August 2013 and peaked at number 2 on the Country Airplay chart in October 2013. The album's third single, "Drink a Beer", was released to country radio on October 24, 2013. It reached number one on the Hot Country Songs chart in January 2014 and number one on the Country Airplay chart in February 2014. During the kickoff show for his 2014 That's My Kind of Night Tour in Columbus, Ohio, Bryan announced to the crowd that "Play It Again" would become the album's fourth single. This song reached number one on both the Hot Country Songs and Country Airplay charts in May 2014. At the same time, Bryan sang guest vocals on Florida Georgia Line's 2014 single "This Is How We Roll". On July 14, 2014, the song "Roller Coaster" was released as the album's fifth single. It reached number one on the Country Airplay chart in October 2014. The album's sixth single, "I See You", was released to country radio on November 3, 2014. It reached number one on the Hot Country Songs and Country Airplay charts in February 2015.

On March 11, 2014, Bryan began his sixth year of spring performances at Spinnaker Beach Club in Panama City Beach, Florida. On the same day, he also released his sixth Spring Break EP, Spring Break 6...Like We Ain't Ever.

Bryan is the only country music artist to release an album of six number one singles on both the Billboard's Hot Country Songs and Country Airplay charts.

2015–2018: Kill the Lights and What Makes You Country
On November 11, 2014, it was confirmed that Bryan had begun writing and recording songs for his upcoming fifth studio album. His last Spring Break album, Spring Break...Checkin' Out, was released on March 10, 2015. It includes the six songs from the previous year's EP and five original new songs.

On May 19, 2015, Bryan released his first single from his fifth studio album, Kill the Lights, "Kick the Dust Up", which peaked at number one on the Country Airplay chart. He co-wrote over half of the songs on this album.  This album provides not only his country flare, but also has tracks that include a disco type beat along with the songs of romance. The album's second single, "Strip It Down", was released to country radio on August 4, 2015. The album was released on August 7. Kill the Lights sold 345,000 total copies its first week and beat out Dr. Dre's Compton to debut at number one on the Billboard 200 chart. "Strip It Down" went number one in October 2015, making fourteen cumulative number ones. The album's third single, "Home Alone Tonight", released to country radio on November 23, 2015.  The song also became his fifteenth song to reach number one. The album's fourth single, "Huntin', Fishin' and Lovin' Every Day", released to country radio on March 14, 2016. All six of the singles released from Bryan's Kill the Lights album reached number one on the Billboard Country Airplay chart, making Bryan the first artist in the 27-year history of the chart to achieve six number one singles from one album.

It was announced that Bryan would perform at halftime of the 2015 Thanksgiving match-up between the Dallas Cowboys and Carolina Panthers.

In 2016, Bryan was selected as one of 30 artists to perform on "Forever Country", a mash-up track of "Take Me Home, Country Roads", "On the Road Again" and "I Will Always Love You" which celebrates 50 years of the CMA Awards.

On February 5, 2017, Bryan performed the National Anthem at Super Bowl LI at NRG Stadium in Houston, TX. In September 2017, Bryan was announced as a judge for the revival of American Idol on ABC.

Bryan released "Light It Up" in mid-2017. It served as the lead-off single to his sixth album, What Makes You Country, which was released on December 8, 2017. "Most People Are Good" and "Sunrise, Sunburn, Sunset" were released as the album's second and third singles, respectively. The album's fourth single, the album's title track, released to country radio on October 22, 2018.

When American Idol returned for another season on ABC, Bryan returned along with Katy Perry and Lionel Richie as judges.

2019–2021: Born Here Live Here Die Here
"Knockin' Boots" was released to country radio in March 2019. In October 2019, "What She Wants Tonight" was released to country radio as the second single from his upcoming album. In January 2020, Bryan announced his next album would be titled Born Here Live Here Die Here and was scheduled to be released on April 24, 2020. The announcement of the album followed the announcement of his upcoming Proud to Be Right Here Tour. On March 13, 2020, "One Margarita" was released as the third single from his upcoming album. Due to the COVID-19 pandemic, Bryan delayed the release of the album to August 7, 2020, and rescheduled the Proud to Be Right Here Tour to 2021. On June 12, 2020, Bryan released the track "Build Me A Daddy" along with a music video for the song. On October 19, 2020, the song "Down to One" was made the fourth single from the album. A Deluxe edition of Born Here Live Here Die Here, released on April 9, 2021, produced the album's fifth single, "Waves", as well as its sixth single, "Up," which was released on October 11, 2021. In October, it was announced that Bryan would host the 55th Annual Country Music Association Awards for the first time, making him the first solo host in 18 years.

Hosting 
Luke hosted the 50th annual ACM awards in 2015 with famous country singer Blake Shelton. Luke Bryan sung "I See You" and won entertainer of the year. Bryan was so thankful for his family also for his fans and wouldn't have been where he was without them.

Luke hosted the 55th annual CMA awards in 2021. The awards show was held in Nashville Tennessee. Luke Bryan won entertainer of the year. Since it was the 55th annual, special celebrates came to watch the show. Bryan had the privilege to honor so many of his friends and knew it was something he couldn't pass up.

Bryan is going to be hosting the 56th annual CMA awards with retired NFL quarterback Payton Manning in Nashville Tennessee in November 2022. Both Luke and Peyton are exciting to host together, Luke even said "Hey Peyton, I hope you're ready for the night of your life!"

Personal life
Bryan is married to Caroline Boyer. They married on December 8, 2006, and have two sons together. They live in Williamson County, near Nashville. They named the house "Red Bird Farm" after Luke's older sister Kelly passed away. His house is based on the Blackberry farm in Knoxville.

In 2007, Bryan's older sister Kelly died unexpectedly at home of unknown causes. After Kelly's husband Ben Lee Cheshire died in 2014, Bryan and his wife began raising their nephew and taking care of their nieces.

The combined losses of his brother and sister inspired the performance of Bryan's single Drink a Beer (written by Chris Stapleton).

In 2015, Forbes estimated Bryan's annual income at $42.5 million.

Philanthropy
Bryan has supported numerous charities and causes, including the City of Hope and Red Cross. Past causes Bryan supported were AIDS and HIV, cancer, children's disaster relief, health, and human rights.

Following the death of her niece, Bryan's wife Caroline established Brett's Barn in her honor. Brett's Barn, located on their family farm, is a sanctuary for rescue animals that invites sick children to spend time with the over 20 animals they host on the farm. She and Bryan are also on the board of directors of the Brett Boyer Foundation, which raises awareness for Down Syndrome and congenital heart disease. The organization also hosts a number of fundraisers to raise money for research, including "Bike for Brett" which occurs annually on World Down Syndrome Day.

Other ventures

Crash My Playa 
Crash My Playa is a 4-night all-inclusive concert vacation hosted by Luke Bryan in Cancun, Mexico. Past performers include Blake Shelton, Jason Aldean, Florida Georgia Line, Dierks Bentley, Chris Stapleton, Little Big Town, Sam Hunt, Dustin Lynch, Luke Combs, and Thomas Rhett.

Luke's 32 Bridge Food + Drink 
Luke's 32 Bridge Food + Drink is located in the heart of Broadway Street in Nashville, Tennessee. The 30,000 square feet multi-level entertainment facility features 6 levels, 8 bars, 3 stages with live music and two restaurants.

32 Bridge Entertainment 
Luke Bryan started his own record label, 32 Bridge Entertainment, under the Universal Music Group Nashville umbrella. In 2018, Jon Langston became the first artist signed to the new label.

Artistry

Vocals
Bryan possesses a high baritone vocal range of two octaves from A2 to A4. Commenting on his vocal performance in "Tailgates and Tanlines," Slant magazine's Jonathan Keefer described Bryan's voice as "a pleasant, if slightly nasal, baritone".

Influences
Bryan has cited country artists George Strait, Alan Jackson, Alabama, and Merle Haggard as influences on his career. He also cited hip hop bands Beastie Boys and Run-D.M.C. as a source of inspiration in an interview with The Huffington Post, noting, "I think there's been somewhat of a change with our generation. You know, nobody grew up more countrier than me, but I mean, I had Beastie Boys playing on little boom boxes and Run D.M.C. and all forms of music, so through the years, I just think it's all constantly blending together."

Discography

Studio albums
 I'll Stay Me (2007)
 Doin' My Thing (2009)
 Tailgates & Tanlines (2011)
 Crash My Party (2013)
 Kill the Lights (2015)
 What Makes You Country (2017)
 Born Here Live Here Die Here (2020)

Tours

Headlining
Dirt Road Diaries Tour (2013)
That's My Kind of Night Tour (2014–2015)
Kick the Dust Up Tour (2015)
Kill The Lights Tour (2016–2017)
Huntin', Fishin' and Lovin' Every Day Tour (2017)
What Makes You Country Tour (2018)
Sunset Repeat Tour (2019)
Proud to Be Right Here Tour (2021)
 Raised Up Right Tour (2022)
 Country On Tour (2023)
Supporting
Emotional Traffic Tour with Tim McGraw (2011)
My Kind of Party Tour with Jason Aldean (2012)
Own The Night Tour with Lady Antebellum (2012)
Night Train Tour with Jason Aldean (2013), one show

Minor tours
Farm Tour (2010–present)

Festivals
Crash My Playa (2015—2020; will resume 2022)

Residencies
Las Vegas (2022)

Awards and nominations

Filmography

References

External links
 

1976 births
Living people
American country singer-songwriters
Bro-country singers
Capitol Records artists
Country musicians from Georgia (U.S. state)
Country pop musicians
People from Leesburg, Georgia
American male singer-songwriters
American country guitarists
American male guitarists
21st-century American guitarists
Guitarists from Georgia (U.S. state)
21st-century American male singers
21st-century American singers
Singer-songwriters from Georgia (U.S. state)
Judges in American reality television series